The Minnesota Monument is an American Civil War memorial in the Little Rock National Cemetery in Little Rock, Arkansas. Also known as "Taps", it depicts a Union Army soldier, his bare head slightly bowed. His hands resting on the butt of his rifle, which is inverted, with the barrel resting on the ground. It is dedicated to the 36 soldiers from Minnesota who are buried here. The sculpture was designed by John Karl Daniels, and was funded by the state of Minnesota. It was dedicated in 1916.

The memorial was listed on the National Register of Historic Places in 1996.

See also

National Register of Historic Places listings in Little Rock, Arkansas

References

1916 sculptures
Historic district contributing properties in Arkansas
Monuments and memorials in Little Rock, Arkansas
Monuments and memorials on the National Register of Historic Places in Arkansas
National Register of Historic Places in Little Rock, Arkansas
Neoclassical architecture in Arkansas
Statues in Arkansas
Union (American Civil War) monuments and memorials